The Vienna Cup refers to one of two competitions:

Vienna Cup (football)
A figure skating competition also known as the Karl Schäfer Memorial.